Manon De Roey (born 12 December 1991) is a professional golfer from Belgium who plays on the Ladies European Tour. In 2022, she won the Aramco Team Series – Bangkok individual title.

Amateur career 
De Roey started playing golf at age 11 and won her first tournament at age 16, the Belgian Youth Trophy. A year later she won the Flanders Trophy and was awarded with the Annette de Vooght Trophy for best Belgian female player under-18.

She became a member of the Belgian National Team in 2008 and competed for her country at several European Girls' Team Championship and European Ladies' Team Championships, as well as the 2014 World Amateur Team Championship, the Espirito Santo Trophy, in Karuizawa, Japan.

After graduating from the Top Sport School for Golf in Hasselt, Belgium, in 2010, she studied at the University of New Mexico and graduated with a major in Psychology and minor in Management in May 2014. She played college golf in the New Mexico Lobos team for four years. In 2012, she won the Colonel Wallenberg's RAM Classic in Fort Collins, Colorado and the Mountain West Championships at the Mission Hills Country Club. In 2014, the New Mexico Lobos won the Mountain West Conference, again at Mission Hills Country Club. De Roey received honours as an All-American Scholar from the National Golf Coaches Association in 2010 and was named All-Conference Second Team in 2013 and 2014.

Professional career 
De Roey joined the Ladies European Tour (LET) in 2016 but failed to make an impact and dropped down to the LET Access Series for the 2017 season, where she had three top-10 finishes including a T3 at the Swedish PGA Championship and finished 6th on the Order of Merit. In 2018, De Roey played in 12 LET events with a best result of T22 in the season-ending Andalucia Costa Del Sol Open De España. She also played in 11 events on the LET Access Series and won her first professional title, the WPGA International Challenge, at Stoke-by-Nayland in England. In 2019, she played in 14 LET tournaments and recorded four top-10 finishes, ending 23rd on the Order of Merit. She also played on the LET Access Series where she won two tournaments, including successfully defending her title at the WPGA International Challenge, and finished best woman and third overall in the St Malo Golf Mixed Open.

In March 2020, De Roey started the final round of the Women's NSW Open in Australia with a five-shot lead after rounds of 71, 64 and 66, but faltered on the final nine and shot 75, ultimately finishing second two strokes behind Julia Engström.

In 2022, De Roey clinched her first LET title winning the Aramco Team Series – Bangkok individual title. She went into the final day two shots behind leader Patty Tavatanakit, but equaled the course record firing a bogey-free 66 (−6) to win with a total of 13-under-par, three strokes ahead of runner-up Johanna Gustavsson.

She earned her LPGA Tour card for 2023 via Q-School.

Amateur wins
2008 Belgian Youth Trophy
2009 Flanders Trophy
2012 Colonel Wallenberg's RAM Classic, Mountain West Championships
2013 Belgian National Strokeplay
2014 Belgian National Strokeplay, Belgian National Matchplay
Source:

Professional wins (5)

Ladies European Tour (1)

LET Access Series (3)

ALPG Tour wins (1)
2020 Aoyuan International Moss Vale Pro-Am

Team appearances
Amateur
European Girls' Team Championship (representing Belgium): 2009
European Ladies' Team Championship (representing Belgium): 2010, 2011, 2013, 2014
Espirito Santo Trophy (representing Belgium): 2014

Professional
European Championships (representing Belgium): 2018

References

External links
 
 
 
 
 
 

Belgian female golfers
Ladies European Tour golfers
LPGA Tour golfers
Olympic golfers of Belgium
Golfers at the 2020 Summer Olympics
New Mexico Lobos women's golfers
Sportspeople from Antwerp
1991 births
Living people
20th-century Belgian women
21st-century Belgian women